Jack Carson may refer to:

 Jack Carson (1910–1963; born John Elmer Carson), Canadian-American actor
 Jack Carson (cricketer) (born 2000), English cricketer

 The Jack Carson Show (1949–1956), a U.S. radio variety show

See also
 Jackie Carson (born 1978), U.S. basketball coach
 John Carson (disambiguation)
 Carson (disambiguation)
 Jack (disambiguation)